Bobby Becken is a Canadian voice actor, active between 1987 and 1989. He made his debut in 1987 on the Stevie Mumford TV movie A Mouse, A Mystery and Me. The majority of Becken's work was on the 1989 children's series Babar, as the character 'Pom'. He featured in the first two series of the show, and consequently the 1989 release, Babar: The Movie, which served as a follow up to the first series.

Filmography

External links
 

Year of birth missing (living people)
Living people
Canadian male voice actors
Canadian male child actors